Mesalina adramitana, also known as the Hadramaut sand lizard, is a species of sand-dwelling lizard in the family Lacertidae. It occurs in Qatar, Yemen, Oman, United Arab Emirates, and Saudi Arabia.

References

adramitana
Reptiles described in 1917
Taxa named by George Albert Boulenger